Chris Brown is the debut studio album by American singer Chris Brown. It was released on November 29, 2005 through Jive Records. The production on the album was handled by multiple producers including Scott Storch, Cool & Dre, Oak Felder, Bryan-Michael Cox and The Underdogs among others. The album also features guest appearances by Juelz Santana, Lil Wayne, Bow Wow and Jermaine Dupri.

The working of the album took place between February and May 2005. Chris Brown is an R&B and hip hop soul album, that focuses on teenage lovelife.

Chris Brown was supported by five singles: "Run It!", "Yo (Excuse Me Miss)", "Gimme That (Remix)", "Say Goodbye" and "Poppin'". The album was a commercial success and debuted at number two on the US Billboard 200 chart, selling 154,000 copies in its first week. It has been certified triple platinum by the Recording Industry Association of America (RIAA). At the 49th Grammy Awards, the album earned Brown his first two Grammy Award nominations for Best New Artist and Best Contemporary R&B Album.

Background and recording
At age 13, Brown was discovered by Hitmission Records, a local production team that visited his father's gas station while searching for new talent. Hitmission's Lamont Fleming provided voice coaching for Brown, and the team helped to arrange a demo package and approached contacts in New York to seek a record deal. Tina Davis, senior A&R executive, promoted the singer to labels such as Jive Records, J-Records and Warner Bros. Records. After Mark Pitts heard of him he immediately offered him a contract that Brown signed with Jive Records on Christmas Eve of 2004. At the time, he dropped out of tenth grade at his Essex High School in Virginia, in favor of tutoring.

Brown developed the concept for the album along with Mark Pitts and Tina Davis, and began recording it in Miami, Florida. Brown's original intention on the album was to both rap and sing on the records, but Pitts convinced him to stick to just singing, he said that "I was trying to keep it at, ‘You’re a singer’ I was caught up in the idea of ‘Stay in your lane’". Brown worked on 50 songs before coming to a final 14 tracks to be included on his first album. Brown wrote half of the tracks. Brown said: "I write about the things that 16 year olds go through every day, keepin it real with what it is. Like you just got in trouble for sneaking your girl into the house, or you can't drive, so you steal a car or something". The album was initially titled Young Love, however, with that idea for the album title has been discarded as being "too kiddie".

Promotion
Through the winter, Brown joined the Scream V Encore Tour, featuring Ciara, Bow Wow, Omarion and Marques Houston, as a supporting act. Later, he headlined the Xbox 360 Presents: Chris Brown Tour, supported by T-Pain.

On June 13, 2006, Brown released a DVD entitled Chris Brown's Journey, which shows footage of him traveling in England and Japan, getting ready for his first visit to the Grammy Awards, behind the scenes of his music videos and bloopers. On August 17, 2006, to further promote the album, Brown began his major co-headlining tour, The Up Close and Personal Tour.

Music
Chris Brown is an R&B and hip hop soul album, that was described by Pitchforks critic Jules Verano as "the perfect epitome of 2000's R&B music sound" along with Ne-Yo's debut album In My Own Words. The album is essentially about teenage lovelife, mixing themes of first approaches to love involvement, infatuation, physical attractiveness and coolness. The album also has few episodes where the singer mentions sex with older women, explains his growing up, portrays his "young street credibility", and talks about his relationship with his mother.

Singles
His official debut single from the album, "Run It!" was released on June 30, 2005. The song features guest vocals from an American rapper Juelz Santana, with the production that was handled by a high-profile hip hop producer Scott Storch. It reached number one on the US Billboard Hot 100, where it stayed for over five weeks, and also achieved continuous airplays, also topping on the airplays for the Billboard Hot 100. As number one on the Billboard Hot 100, Run It! was preceded by Kanye West's "Gold Digger", and succeeded by Mariah Carey's "Don't Forget About Us". The song also topped it on the Billboard Pop 100, a now defunct chart. "Run It!" takes place in a party setting, with Brown explaining, "It's really a guy checking for a girl, or a girl checking for a guy...asking to see if they can run it. If they can be eligible to be your girlfriend, boyfriend, whatever. 'Let me see if you can run it; show me what you got.'"  "Yo (Excuse Me Miss)" discusses the first conversation someone has with a girl: "Fellas, first thing they say when they see a girl is 'Yo! Yo!'. I'm saying it like that, but technically not like that. She takes my breath away, all I can say is 'Yo, let me just talk to you for a minute. Chill with me for a minute.'"

The album's second single, "Yo (Excuse Me Miss)" was released on December 13, 2005. The song's production was handled by the duo Dre & Vidal. The song charted in the top ten on the Hot 100 in the US.

The remix to "Gimme That", which features guest vocals from a fellow American rapper Lil Wayne, was released as the album's third single on May 7, 2006.

The album's fourth single, "Say Goodbye" was released on August 8, 2006. The song's production was handled by Bryan-Michael Cox. The song peaked at number 10 in the United States.

The album's fifth and final single, "Poppin'" was released on November 21, 2006. The production on this track was handled by Dre & Vidal. The song charted in the top 40 in most charts outside the United States.

Critical reception

Chris Brown received mixed reviews from critics. Andy Kellman of AllMusic said that the album "almost always involves an even push-and-pull between what appeals to kids who don't consider street credibility and those who do", praising Brown's introduction in R&B music as "a refreshing presence, a high-schooler who's neither as family friendly as Will Smith nor as comically vulgar as Pretty Ricky.  Leah Greenblatt of Entertainment Weekly criticized the album in a short, mixed review, saying that the album is "Perfect for the homecoming dance, but you’ll need a chaperone.".

Commercial performance
Chris Brown debuted at number two on the US Billboard 200 chart, selling 154,000 copies in its first week. This became Brown's first US top-ten debut. The album also debuted at number one on the US Top R&B/Hip-Hop Albums chart, becoming his first number one on that chart. On December 18, 2006, the album was a certified double platinum by the Recording Industry Association of America (RIAA) for sales of over two million copies. As of April 2011, the album has sold 2.1 million copies in the United States alone and over three million copies worldwide.

Track listing
Credits adapted from BMI and ASCAP.

A 2006 re-issue of the album includes 2 bonus tracks: So Glad and Seen the Light (feat. Rico Love).Notes(*) Denotes co-producer.
(^) Denotes additional producer.Samples credits'

"Ain't No Way (You Won't Love Me)" contains a portion of the composition from "Song of the Dragon & Phoenix" written by Zhang Fuquan.

Personnel

Executive producers: Chris Brown, Tina Davis, Mark Pitts
Art direction: Courtney Walter
A&R: Leticia Hilliard, Matt Schwartz
Assistant recording engineers: Val Brathwrite (track 7), Vadim Chislov (2, 5, 16), Anthony G. Crisano (1, 5, 9, 12, 15–16), Patrick Magee (2, 5, 16), Lucas McLendon (1), Tadd Mingo (14), Aaron Renner (4, 6, 10)
Bass: David Cabrerra (track 9)
Design: Courtney Walter
Recording engineers: Wayne Allison (tracks 2, 5, 16), Vincent Dilorenzo (3, 11), Conrad Golding (2, 5, 16), Dabling "Hobby Boy" Harward (4, 6, 10), John Horesco IV (14), Eddie Hustle (music 1), Charles McCrorey (2, 5, 9, 16), Oak Felder (8), Carlos Paucar (5, 16), Keith Sengbusch (9, 12), Kelly Sheehan (4, 6, 10), Shea Taylor (15), Sam Thomas (7, 13)
Guitar: Val Brathwrite, Aaron Fishbein (tracks 2, 5, 16), David Cabrerra (9)
Keyboards: Kendrick Dean (tracks 7, 13), Shea Taylor (15)
Mastering: Herb Powers
Mixing: Kevin "KD" Davis (track 8), Vincent Dilorenzo (3, 11), Jermaine Dupri (14), Jean-Marie Horvat (7, 13), Eddie Hustle (1), Rich Keller (12), Phil Tan (14), The Underdogs (4, 6, 10), Stephen "Stevo" George (15), Brian Stanley (2, 5, 9, 16)
Mixing assistant: Val Brathwaite (tracks 2, 5, 16), Steve Tolle (9), Mike Tschupp (2)
Multi instruments: Bryan-Michael Cox (tracks 7, 13), Vidal Davis (3, 11), Andre Harris (3, 11), Shea Taylor (drum machine 15)
Photography: Clay Patrick McBride
Remix producer: Jermaine Dupri (track 14), L-Rock (14)
Background vocals: Steve Russell (track 10)
Vocal producer: Lamont "LA" Flemming (track 15), Shannon "Slam" Lawrence (12)
Vocal recording: Charles McCrorey (tracks 1, 15), Stephen "Stevo" George (additional 15)
Vocal tracking: Ian Crosse (track 8)

Charts

Weekly charts

Year-end charts

Certifications

References 

2005 debut albums
Albums produced by Bryan-Michael Cox
Albums produced by Cool & Dre
Albums produced by Dre & Vidal
Albums produced by Jermaine Dupri
Albums produced by Scott Storch
Albums produced by Sean Garrett
Albums produced by the Underdogs (production team)
Chris Brown albums
Jive Records albums
Albums produced by Oak Felder
Hip hop soul albums